Brickworks Constituency was a constituency in Singapore. It used to exist from 1976 to 1988. It merged part of Leng Kee and Pasir Panjang.

Member of Parliament

Elections

References 

Singaporean electoral divisions